Milan Smiljanić (born 19 November 1986) is a Serbian professional footballer who plays as a midfielder for OFK Beograd.

Early life
Smiljanić was born in Kalmar, Sweden, as his father Branko, who was also a professional footballer, was playing for Kalmar AIK FK at the time.

Club career

Partizan
Smiljanić subsequently returned to Serbia and joined FK Partizan youth ranks. Under head coach Vladimir Vermezović, he made his debut for the first team in a league match against FK Sutjeska Nikšić, during the second part of 2004–05.

Smiljanić also spent some time playing for farm team FK Teleoptik and, in little more than two professional seasons, he amassed more than 50 official appearances with the club, and eventually gained club captaincy despite his age.

Espanyol
On 18 July 2007, Spain's RCD Espanyol agreed with Partizan for the transfer of Smiljanić for an undisclosed fee, in a five-year contract. He made his La Liga debut against Real Valladolid on 26 August, in a 0–1 home loss; most of his first two seasons in Catalonia were spent mainly appearing from the bench, even though one of his main competitors in the team, Iván de la Peña, was often injured.

After the club's initial unsuccessful attempts to loan him out for 2009–10, Smiljanić spent the first months of the new campaign only training, not having been given any squad number. However, such a move was arranged in late January 2010, as he joined Sporting de Gijón until June.

Partizan return
In the summer of 2010, Smiljanić was loaned to his former club Partizan. After his loan expired he returned to Spain and agreed the contract termination with the Barcelona-based club.

Smiljanić signed a permanent contract with Partizan on 16 August 2011, penning a two-year deal.

Gençlerbirliği
On 29 May 2013, it was announced that Gençlerbirliği S.K. had agreed terms with Smiljanić to sign him as a free agent. He appeared in only four competitive games during his spell, his Süper Lig debut coming on 19 October 2013 in a 1–3 home loss against Kasımpaşa SK.

Smiljanić was released on 30 June 2015.

Later years
On 30 July 2015, Smiljanić joined Maccabi Netanya F.C. on a 1+1 contract. He left Israel the following 9 August, moving alongside countryman Nebojša Marinković to A-League club Perth Glory FC. On 16 February 2017, he left the latter via mutual termination of his contract to explore opportunities in Asia.

On 15 June 2017, Smiljanić returned to the Israeli Premier League and signed with newly promoted Hapoel Ashkelon FC.

Partizan, Take Three 
In June 2018, Smiljanić returned to his original club for the third time, committing to a two-year contract. In June 2019, he was appointed Partizan Belgrade Vice-captain.

International career
After the 2006–07 season, Smiljanić was called up by Serbia under-21 coach Miroslav Đukić to be part of his squad for the 2007 UEFA European Championships. He helped the national side finish runner-up in the tournament, to hosts the Netherlands.

Smiljanić made his full debut on 22 August 2007, in a 2–3 loss against Belgium in Brussels for the UEFA Euro 2008 qualifiers. In July of the following year he was picked to the 18-man squad for the 2008 Summer Olympics, with Đukić again as manager – Serbia ranked last in its group.

Next year, Smiljanić appeared in the 2009 European Under-21 Championship as captain, but could not help repeat the previous edition's feat as the nation did not progress through the group stages in his country of birth, Sweden.

Career statistics

Club

International

International goals

References

External links

 
 National team data 
 

1986 births
Living people
People from Kalmar
Swedish people of Serbian descent
Serbian footballers
Association football midfielders
Serbian SuperLiga players
FK Partizan players
La Liga players
RCD Espanyol footballers
Sporting de Gijón players
Süper Lig players
Gençlerbirliği S.K. footballers
Israeli Premier League players
Maccabi Netanya F.C. players
Hapoel Ashkelon F.C. players
A-League Men players
Perth Glory FC players
Serbia under-21 international footballers
Serbia international footballers
Footballers at the 2008 Summer Olympics
Olympic footballers of Serbia
Serbian expatriate footballers
Expatriate footballers in Spain
Expatriate footballers in Turkey
Expatriate footballers in Israel
Expatriate soccer players in Australia
Serbian expatriate sportspeople in Spain
Serbian expatriate sportspeople in Turkey
Serbian expatriate sportspeople in Israel
Serbian expatriate sportspeople in Australia